Style is a peer-reviewed academic journal of style, stylistics, and poetics in literature published by Penn State University Press. It is indexed by the Arts & Humanities Citation Index, IBZ, MLA International Bibliography, and SCOPUS.

References 

 
Penn State University Press academic journals
Linguistics journals
Quarterly journals
Publications established in 1967